Luca Ceccarelli (born 24 March 1983) is an Italian footballer, who is vacant at the moment, and usually plays as either a right back for San Marino Calcio.

Career

Cesena
Born in Gambettola, the Province of Forlì-Cesena, Romagna, Ceccarelli started his career at Cesena. He won Serie C1 promotion playoffs in 2004. He then loaned back to Serie C1 clubs Pavia and San Marino Calcio. After Cesena was relegated in June 2008, Ceccarelli returned to the team for their Lega Pro Prima Divisione (ex-Serie C1) campaign, which Romagna side won the Group A champion.

2009–10 season
In 2009–10 season, he played as an emergency central back (against Frosinone in May 2010) and other positions, including right back ahead Martin Petráš in last 10 matches of the season. That season Cesena won promotion to Serie A.

2010–11 season
Ceccarelli made his debut on the first round of 2010–11 Serie A, a 0–0 draw with previous season runner-up Roma. He lost his starting place in November, after the match slipped from the top to bottom and failed to win for over 5 matches. Yuto Nagatomo was moved from left back to right back and Maurizio Lauro took back the starting place. On 28 November he re-took the starting place but rested against Cagliari on 18 December, the match before the winter break.

After Nagatomo left the club in January for international duty, his starting place became solid again, only missed the match against Roma. In late January Nagatomo left for Internazionale, in exchange with Davide Santon, made Ceccarelli played more regularly, only missed the match against the strong team for team tactic, as the coach demanded a more defensive right-back instead of a wing-back: Napoli (replaced by Dellafiore), Juventus, Lazio and Palermo (replaced by Santon) and a relegation decider (against bottom team Bari)

Overall, he started 25 times, made the most assists among the teammate (5), cautioned 6 times and suspended once (in round 28).

2011–12 season
At the start of season Cesena signed experienced right-back Gianluca Comotto, made Ceccarelli became his understudy.

Padova (loan)
In summer 2013 he was signed by Padova, with Niccolò Galli moved to opposite direction.

Bologna
In June 2014 Bologna signed Ceccarelli (in a cashless swap with Federico Agliardi), in a 3-year contract. He played 29 games out of possible 42 games of 2014–15 Serie B season for the promotion playoff winner.

He failed to play any game for Bologna in 2015–16 Serie A. On 13 January 2016 Ceccarelli returned to Serie B for Salernitana in a temporary deal.

On 31 August 2016 Ceccarelli was released by Bologna.

Dinamo București
In October 2016 Ceccarelli signed a deal with Romanian side Dinamo București.

Honours
Lega Pro Prima Divisione: 2009

References

External links
 Profile at La Gazzetta dello Sport 2009-10 
 Profile at AIC.Football.it 
 Profile at Cesena 
 Lega Serie B profile 

1983 births
Living people
People from Gambettola
Italian footballers
Association football midfielders
A.C. Cesena players
A.S.D. Sangiovannese 1927 players
F.C. Pavia players
A.S.D. Victor San Marino players
A.C. Legnano players
Calcio Padova players
Bologna F.C. 1909 players
FC Dinamo București players
Serie A players
Serie B players
Serie C players
Liga I players
Italian expatriate footballers
Italian expatriate sportspeople in San Marino
Italian expatriate sportspeople in Romania
Expatriate footballers in San Marino
Expatriate footballers in Romania
Footballers from Emilia-Romagna
Sportspeople from the Province of Forlì-Cesena